HMS Pheasant was a Modified Black Swan-class sloop of the Royal Navy. She was laid down by Yarrow Shipbuilders, in Scotstoun, Glasgow on 13 July 1942, launched on 21 December 1942, and commissioned on 12 May 1943. She was adopted by the rural district of Runcorn, then in Cheshire, as part of Warship Week in 1942.

Design
The Modified Black Swan-class sloops were specialised convoy-defence vessels, with an anti-aircraft and an anti-submarine capability. They were designed to have a longer range than a destroyer at the expense of  lower top speed while remaining capable of outrunning the German Type VII and Type IX U-boats when they were surfaced.

Pheasant had a top speed of  - their prey, the German U-boats, could only manage  on the surface and no more than  submerged.

Service history
In the latter part of the war, Pheasant was sent to the Pacific theatre.

After being placed on the disposal list Pheasant was sold for scrap, arriving at Troon for breaking on 15 January 1963.

Notes

References

External links 
  Family History website with details and photographs Active old shipmates organisation
  HMS PHEASANT Chronologies of War Service on naval-history.net

 

Black Swan-class sloops
World War II sloops of the United Kingdom
Sloops of the United Kingdom
1942 ships